Henry Hamilton may refer to:

Henry Hamilton (Irish politician) (1692–1743), Irish MP for St Johnstown (Donegal) and Donegal County
Henry Hamilton (colonial administrator) (c. 1734–1796), Lt. Governor of Quebec and Governor of Bermuda and Dominica
Henry Hamilton (New York politician) (1788–1846), American lawyer and politician
Henry Hamilton (playwright) (c. 1853–1918), English playwright, lyrist and critic
Henry Hamilton (footballer) (1887–1938), English professional footballer 
Henry Hamilton (priest) (1794–1880), English mathematician and clergyman, Dean of Salisbury
Henry Hamilton (winemaker), founder of a South Australian family winery
Henry Sidney Hamilton (1887–1976), Canadian MP for Algoma West
Henry DeWitt Hamilton (1863–1942), Adjutant General of the New York State Militia